2020 in men's road cycling is about the 2020 men's bicycle races governed by the UCI. The races are part of the UCI Road Calendar.

World Championships

The World Road Championships took place in Imola, Italy from 20 to 27 September 2020. The competition was set to be held in Aigle and Martigny, Switzerland, but was moved due to the Covid-19 crisis.

Grand Tours

UCI World Tour

For the 2020 season, the UCI World Tour calendar contains the same events as in 2019, with the exception of the Tour of California which has been placed on hiatus and the Presidential Tour of Turkey, which was demoted to the newly introduced
ProSeries.

UCI tours

2.Pro Category Races

1.Pro Category Races

Championships

Continental Championships

National Championships

UCI Teams

UCI WorldTeams
The UCI has granted a UCI WorldTour licence to the following nineteen teams:

UCI Professional Continental teams

Deaths
July
 July 17 - Marian Więckowski, 86, Polish racing cyclist.
 July 14 - Luis Orán Castañeda, 41, Colombian racing cyclist (2000 Giro d'Italia), work accident.
 July 2 - Niels De Vriendt, 20, Belgian racing cyclist, heart attack.
June
 June 17 - Fabrice Philipot, 54, French racing cyclist.
 June 17 - Ronny Van Sweevelt, 57, Belgian Olympic racing cyclist (1984), food poisoning.
 June 17 - Pietro Zoppas, 86, Italian racing cyclist.
 June 16 - Eusebio Vélez, 85, Spanish racing cyclist.
May
 May 30 - Roger Decock, 93, Belgian racing cyclist, Tour of Flanders winner (1952).
 May 29 - Henk Steevens, 88, Dutch racing cyclist (1953 Tour de France), cancer.
 May 28 - Gustaaf De Smet, 85, Belgian Olympic cyclist (1956).
April
 April 7 - Domingo Villanueva, 55, Filipino Olympic cyclist (1988, 1992).
March
 March 26 - Roger Baens, 86, Belgian racing cyclist.
 March 26 - Daniel Yuste, 75, Spanish Olympic racing cyclist (1968), COVID-19.
 March 25 - Danilo Barozzi, 92, Italian racing cyclist, complications from a broken femur.
 March 19 - Edi Ziegler, 90, German road racing cyclist, Olympic bronze medallist (1952).
 March 17 - Tadashi Kato, 85, Japanese Olympic cyclist (1952).
 March 9 - Italo De Zan, 94, Italian racing cyclist, COVID-19.
 March 3 - Nicolas Portal, 40, French racing cyclist, sporting director of Team Sky (since 2013), heart attack.
February
 February 29 - Andrei Vedernikov, 60, Russian racing cyclist, world champion (1981).
 February 15 - Wilfried Thaler, 85, Austrian cyclist.
 February 4 - Eugen Pleško, 71, Croatian Olympic cyclist (1972).
January
 January 30 - Nello Fabbri, 85, Italian racing cyclist.
 January 30 - Miguel Arroyo, 53, Mexican road racing cyclist, National champion (2000), complications during surgery.
January 13 - Maurice Moucheraud, 86, French racing cyclist, Olympic champion (1956).
 January 10 - Guido Messina, 89, Italian road and track cyclist, Olympic (1952) and world champion (1948, 1953, 1954, 1955, 1956).

Notes

References

 

Men's road cycling by year